Hou Jian is a fictional character in Water Margin, one of the Four Great Classical Novels of Chinese literature. Nicknamed "Long Armed Ape", he ranks 71st among the 108 Stars of Destiny and 35th among the 72 Earthly Fiends.

Background
Skinny and dexterous, Hou Jian is nicknamed "Long Armed Ape" both for his appearance and his slick skill in needlework. A native of Hongdu (洪都; present-day Nanchang, Jiangxi), Hou, who works as a tailor in a garrison town affiliated to Jiangzhou (江州; present-day Jiujiang, Jiangxi), has learnt martial arts from Xue Yong.

Joining Liangshan
Hou Jian is hired to work as a tailor in the house of Huang Wenbing, a petty government official in the garrison town of Wuwei near to Jiangzhou. Huang one day stumbles upon a seditious poem that Song Jiang, who is living as an exiled prisoner in Jiangzhou, has written on a wall in a restaurant when drunk. Huang reports the poem to Cai Jiu, Jiangzhou's governor. Song Jiang is arrested and soon sentenced to death. The outlaws from Liangshan Marsh hurry to Jiangzhou and save him just when he is going to be beheaded. 

As the group rest in the manor of the Mu brothers (Mu Hong and Mu Chun), Song Jiang swears vengeance against Huang Wenbing. Xue Yong recommends Hou Jian as their guide to get into Wuwei and the official's house. Hou leads the group to Huang's address, where he tricks the official's family to open the door. The outlaws then charge in and kill the entire family. Although Huang himself is not present, he is captured by Zhang Shun on the Xunyang River as he hurries home upon seeing Wuwei is burning. After cutting Huang into pieces, the group, including Hou Jian, heads to Liangshan.

Campaigns and death
Hou Jian is placed in charge of the making of flags and clothes for Liangshan after the 108 Stars of Destiny came together in what is called the Grand Assembly. He participates in the campaigns against the Liao invaders and rebel forces on Song territory following amnesty from Emperor Huizong for Liangshan.

In a flank attack by a waterway led by Ruan Xiaoqi during the campaign against Fang La, Hou Jian, a non-swimmer, drowns when his boat overturns after being swept into the open sea by a storm.

References 
 
 
 
 
 
 
 

72 Earthly Fiends
Fictional tailors
Fictional characters from Jiangxi